Loxioides is a genus of Hawaiian honeycreeper, in the subfamily Carduelinae.

The birds are endemic to Hawaii.

Species
It contains the following species:
 Loxioides bailleui Oustalet, 1877 - palila
 Loxioides kikuichi James & Olson, 2006 - Kauai palila (prehistoric; possibly survived to the early 18th century)

See also
 
 

Hawaiian honeycreepers
Endemic fauna of Hawaii
Bird genera
Bird genera with one living species
Carduelinae
Higher-level bird taxa restricted to the Australasia-Pacific region
Taxa named by Émile Oustalet